Punguk is a small settlement in Nyoma tehsil, Leh district. It is located in the west of Indian Astronomical Observatory, Hanle.

Location 
The settlement is located near to India China border. It is accessible from east via Hanle and from the south via Ukdungle, an Indian Army base.

According to a report published by Geological Survey of India in 1980, the area around Punguk is known for geothermal springs.

References 

Villages in Leh district